This is a list of Michelin starred restaurant in Ireland. Restaurants on the island of Ireland that currently have or have had at least one Michelin star are mentioned here.

List of restaurants

2020–present

2010–2019

2000–2009

1990–1999

1980–1989

1974–1979
There were no stars awarded before 1974, this was the first year Michelin Guide awarded restaurants in Ireland and the United Kingdom.

See also
 List of Michelin 3-star restaurants
 List of Michelin 3-star restaurants in the United Kingdom
 List of Michelin starred restaurants in Scotland
 List of Michelin starred restaurants in the Netherlands

References

Food and drink in Ireland
Lists of restaurants
Restaurants in Ireland
Michelin